The Last Dance is the fourth studio album by the American metal band 40 Below Summer. It was released on October 31 (Halloween) 2006 via Crash Music. The single "Relapse" from the album had a video directed and produced by Frankie Nasso. The CD/DVD combo was released on October 31, 2006 via Crash Music Inc. The two-disc release features nine demo versions of songs intended for their third and final major LP, and a DVD with the band's "last" performance at the Starland Ballroom in New Jersey (September 2005).

Track listing (album)
 "New Age Slaves" – 3:47
 "5 of a Kind" – 4:27
 "Tell Me Now" – 4:20
 "It's About Time" – 3:36
 "Relapse" – 4:32
 "Anxiety 101" – 4:07
 "Alaskan Thunderfuck" – 5:10
 "It's So Easy" (Guns N' Roses cover) – 3:11
 "Cut in Half" – 4:23

Track listing (DVD)
 "Intro"
 "Suck It Up"
 "Rope" (Video)
 "Wither Away"
 "I'm So Ugly"
 "Rope"
 "Falling Down"
 "Still Life"
 "Jonesin'"
 "Little Lover"
 "A Season in Hell"
 "Drown"
 "Taxi Cab Confession"
 "Self Medicate"
 "Step Into the Sideshow"
 "We the People/Credits"

"Falling Down", "Taxi Cab Confession", "Self Medicate" and "Step Into the Sideshow" were all recorded October 15th, 2003 at the Quest club in Minneapolis. All other songs were recorded at the band's farewell gig at the Starland Ballroom.

Personnel

40 Below Summer
 Max Illidge – vocals
 Jordan Plingos – guitar
 Joey D'amico – guitar
 Hector Graziani – bass
 Carlos Aguilar – drums, piano

Production
 40 Below Summer – production
 Max Illidge – recording, mixing, mastering
 Jester Diablo – album art

References

2006 albums
Crash Music Inc. albums
40 Below Summer albums
2006 live albums
Demo albums
2006 video albums
Live video albums